The following highways are numbered 995:

Canada

United States